Dysgonia algira, the passenger, is a moth of the family Noctuidae. The species was first described by Carl Linnaeus in 1767 and is found in the Palearctic - from the southern half of Europe and parts of North Africa through West, Central and South Asia.

Technical description and variation

O. algira L. (= achatina Sulz., triangularis Hbn)  Forewing brownish fuscous, with a purplish tinge when fresh; a whitish median band narrowed in middle, edged inwardly by the erect but slightly outcurved inner line, outwardly by the similarly incurved median line: outer line acutely angled outwards on vein 6 and bluntly bent between veins 3 and 4. then sinuous to inner margin near median line; a black apical streak of two spots; the terminal area violet grey: hindwing fuscous, with a diffuse whitish median band: the terminal area grey at middle: fringe grey, below apex whitish; the ab. mandschuriana Stgr.[ now  full species Dysgonia mandschuriana (Staudinger, 1892) ] is more uniformly purplish or slaty grey, with the median band only slightly paler, not white. Larva yellowish grey, darker on dorsum, with tine black longitudinal lines; venter and feet pale grey; spiracles black; head yellowish grey. The wingspan is 40–46 mm.

Biology
The moth flies from May to August depending on the location. The larvae feed on Rubus and willow.

References

External links
 
 Passenger on UKMoths
 Lepiforum e.V.

Dysgonia
Moths described in 1767
Moths of Africa
Moths of Cape Verde
Moths of Europe
Moths of the Middle East
Moths of Asia
Taxa named by Carl Linnaeus